Röa is a village in Türi Parish, Järva County in central Estonia. Between 1991–2017 (until the administrative reform of Estonian municipalities) the village was located in Väätsa Parish.

References

Villages in Järva County